Meiningen (High Alemannic: Moanege) is a municipality in the district of Feldkirch in the Austrian state of Vorarlberg.

Population

References

Cities and towns in Feldkirch District